District administration is the apex office of a district at the present context of administrative setting of Bangladesh. It is the management of affairs within a district, which is the basic territorial unit of administration in the country. It is at this level that the common man comes into direct contact with the administration. The district falls under the charge of a district officer, called either deputy commissioner or district collector or district magistrate. This officer acts as the representative of the central government at this level.
Like other district administrations of the country, District Administration Rangamati, widely known as the Office of the deputy commissioner is the representative of the cabinet in the Rangamati Hill District.

Evolution of Rangamati District Administration
Bangladesh bears a colonial legacy in its entire public administration system. Present day Bangladesh was a part of the British Empire for almost two hundred years. In 1947, Pakistani rulers replaced the British and dominated the area, then known as East Pakistan until a bitter war in 1971 which brought about an independent Bangladesh.

British era
Chittagong Hill Tracts was a part of Chittagong District before 1860. The region was ruled by the deputy commissioner from Chittagong. Chittagong Hill Tracts was segregated from Chittagong district and made a complete district in 1860. In 1859, a fort situated by the side of canal Kaptai was attacked and demolished by the tribal people from east. So, the then divisional commissioner of Chittagong decided to provide safety to the tribal people of the hill tracts and proposed to the governor of Bengal to segregate the region from regulation district Chittagong. The proposal was accepted and enacted on 1 August 1860 by the Act XXII of the year. An officer entitled as superintendent was appointed. Captain McGrath was made the first superintendent of the district to rule.  He would execute British rule under the provision of the divisional commissioner of Chittagong.
 
Designation of the ruler turned into deputy commissioner from superintendent in 1867. First administrative headquarters of the district was set up at Chandraghona in 1863. But the headquarters transferred to Rangamati from Chandraghona in 1868 and came into effect in the following year. Capt. T. H. Lewin was the first deputy commissioner who moved to Rangamati permanently. But in 1891 Chittagong Hill Tracts lost its position as a district because of the conquest of the Lushai Hills by the British.  Which reduced the importance of Chittagong Hill Tracts as a district. It was made a sub-division of Chittagong district and given the authority to rule to an assistant commissioner. But in 1900, a regulation named Chittagong Hill Tracts regulation 1900 was formulated to administer the area and the position of Chittagong Hill Tracts as a district was reinstated. Officer in charge of the district became superintendent again. At this time, the district was divided into three sub-divisions such as Rangamati, Bandarban & Ramghar. A sub-divisional officer was appointed to each sub-division. Three more sub-divisions were created by three different gazettes in 1979. In 1920, the Chittagong Hill Tracts regulation 1900 was amended and the ruler of the district was renamed as the deputy commissioner and an Indian Civil Service officer was appointed as the deputy commissioner of Chittagong Hill Tracts. Sub-ordinate officers of the deputy commissioner were termed as deputy magistrate or deputy collector and sub-deputy magistrate or sub-deputy collector.

Pakistan Era
In 1960, under the provision of basic democracy 11 Thana porishad and 39 union porishad were created in the Chittagong Hill Tracts. Later this thana was renamed a upazila. Kaptai hydro power station was established in 1960 which brought radical change in the socioeconomic aspects of the people. More than 0.1 million people were affected by this project.

Bangladesh period

Present organogram

The deputy commissioner and district magistrate are at the top of the office. There are multiple additional deputy commissioners at an office to give the hand to the deputy commissioner. In many districts, there are five to six deputy commissioners, but in Rangamati Hill, there are three. Assistant commissioners work under the direct supervision of the deputy commissioner and additional deputy commissioners, who are in charge of various sections of the office. A senior assistant commissioner plays the role of Nezarat Deputy Collector. In every section there is a clerk, MLSS, bearers etc. The senior clerk is known as the head assistant of the section.

Deputy commissioners and district magistrates who served

British Period

Pakistan Period

Bangladesh Period

Functions

District magistracy

Law and order
District magistrate plays vital role for maintaining law, order and discipline. Rules and regulations of the country attribute a large scale of authority to the district magistrate. District magistrate is the chairperson of District Law and Order Committee while the superintendent of police of a district is the vice chairman. District magistrate sends reports to cabinet regarding law and order situation of the district. Police Regulation of Bengal.

Land administration
District Administration was originated mainly for collecting land revenue. Administrative system was evolved by the then East India Company for collecting land revenue. Criminal prosecution, administration, co-ordination of government offices and development activities were later added to the activities of district administration. Deputy commissioner,  as a district collector collects revenue in the jurisdiction of his district. 
Rangamati as a part of Chittagong Hill Tract, maintain different revenue collection system, from other districts of the country. 
From the collecting revenuers government gets 26%, crime chief gets .............. and headman gets.........................

Executive authority

Development

Coordination

Innovation in services

Mid-day meal
District Administration  has started various programs to bring about a positive change in the educational arena of the district. At present district administration is rendering support to poor students of the district.

Distribution of free school dress to students
Rangamati District Administration has taken initiative to distribute school dress to students of primary school. This program has taken by the deputy commissioner of Rangamati. School bag, umbrella and dress have distributed to hundreds of students presently. This program is taken to reduce drop-out of students and to create appreciation among the parents with the objective that they send their off-spring to school.

Bungalow of the Deputy Commissioner & District Magistrate

Bungalow Museum
DC Bungalow museum was established in 2010 by the then deputy commissioner of Rangamati, Mr. Saurendra Nath Chakrabharty. The museum was inaugurated by (the first cabinet secretary of Bangladesh), H. T. Imam, who was the deputy commissioner of Chittagong Hill Tract in 1969. The museum exhibits pictures of all the deputy commissioners. There is also a typewriter of British era. A weight of hundred years old etc. The museum has the collection of government-published calendars of previous 50 years.

Circuit house
Circuit house, Rangamati is under the supervision of deputy commissioner. It is one of the best circuit houses of the country. There are six rooms in the circuit house. All is equipped with modern amenities and fully air-conditioned.

BIAM Laboratory School
BIAM Laboratory School is a joint venture of District Administration, Rangamati and Bangladesh Institute of Administration and Management (BIAM) foundation, Dhaka. the school started its inception in 2012.
Md. Mostafa Kamal, former deputy commissioner of Rangamati took the initiative to establish a quality English medium school in Rangamati. BIAM school has its own campus in Tabalchari area. Assistant commissioner of Education and welfare section perform the duty as the principal of the school.

Rangamati Hill District